"Si tu t'appelles Mélancolie" ("If Your Name Is Melancholia") is a song by Joe Dassin from his 1974 album Joe Dassin (Si tu t'appelles Mélancolie).

The song was based on the song "Please Tell Her (I Said Hello)", originally released by Shepstone & Dibbens;  Dana's cover version became a UK and Irish hit single in 1975/76. It was adapted into French by Pierre Delanoë and Claude Lemesle.

It was released as a single in 1974, with "Vade retro" on the other side.

Track listing 
7" single (CBS S 2891, 1975, Germany etc.)
 "Si tu t'appelles Mélancolie" (3:17)
 "Vade retro" (2:55)

Charts

References 

Songs about depression
1974 songs
1974 singles
Joe Dassin songs
French songs
CBS Records singles
Number-one singles in France
Songs written by Pierre Delanoë
Songs written by Claude Lemesle
Song recordings produced by Jacques Plait